D'ække bare, bare Bernt was a Norwegian sitcom that aired on TV3 from 1996 to 1997, starring Jon Skolmen and Grethe Kausland as the married couple Bernt and Vera Brantenberg.

Plot
The show was about the married couple Bernt and Vera Brantenberg. Bernt is a moody tram driver and his wife, Vera, owns a kiosk. They live in an old apartment on the east side of Oslo.

The show was based on the American sitcom The Honeymooners.

Cast

External links
Filmfront.no

TV3 (Norway) original programming
1996 Norwegian television series debuts
1997 Norwegian television series endings
1990s Norwegian television series
Norwegian television sitcoms